Morissette may refer to:

Morissette (singer) (born 1996), a Filipina singer, songwriter, and actress
 Morissette (album), the debut album by Morissette
Morissette (surname), people with the name
Alanis Morissette (born 1974), a Canadian singer-songwriter, producer and actress
Morissette v. United States, a 1952 U.S. Supreme Court case concerning criminal intent

See also
Morisset (disambiguation)
Morrissette (disambiguation)
Chateau Morrisette Winery, a winery in Virginia, United States